South Carolina Highway 277 (SC 277) is a  state highway in the U.S. state of South Carolina. It travels from U.S. Route 76 (US 76) in downtown Columbia to Interstate 77 (I-77; at its exit 18) in Dentsville in Richland County. For most of its length, it is a controlled-access highway conforming to interstate standards. The highway serves as a spur into Columbia from its northeastern suburbs and from intercity traffic traveling from I-77 and I-20.

Route description

SC 277 begins at the intersection of Elmwood Avenue and Bull Street in downtown Columbia. From this point, US 76 heads south along Bull Street and west along Elmwood Avenue. SC 277 heads north on a six-lane surface divided highway passing a residential neighborhood to the west and state office buildings to the east. The freeway passes over SC 16 with a partial interchange allowing an entrance and exit from the north. It curves to the northeast cutting through a residential neighborhood and reaches a diamond interchange with SC 555. After passing over two separate railroad lines, SC 277 has an interchange with Fontaine Avenue. At this point, the freeway exits the city of Columbia and enters the census designated place of Dentsville. SC 277 interchanges with I-20 but with two movements towards the east not provided (the two connections are provided via I-77). The freeway enters a more wooded area and has an interchange with Parklane Road. Shortly thereafter, SC 277 reaches its end at I-77. Additional connections with I-77's exit 19 (for SC 555) are also provided within this interchange.

History

SC 277 was originally part of a plan to construct an urban-loop expressway through Columbia shortly following federal approval of extending I-77 to the city from Charlotte in 1969. The initial phase of the highway was logically conceived as an alternative to increasingly congested Farrow Road (SC 555). The highway split from I-77 at what is now exit 19, proceeding through downtown Columbia roughly parallel to Farrow Rd. and Huger Street, finally merging with I-26 near the present-day terminus of I-77 in Cayce. New parallel spans over the Congaree River, as well as a direct connection to I-126 at an improved Huger St. interchange were part of the original plan. Construction began at I-20 in 1973, opening in stages from the planned Bull Street interchange northward to I-77 through the end of 1977.

Exit list

See also

References

External links

 
SC 277 at Virginia Highways' South Carolina Highways Annex

277
Transportation in Columbia, South Carolina
Transportation in Richland County, South Carolina
Freeways in the United States
Interstate 77